Inside West Coast Customs is a car remodeling reality television show based in Burbank, California. The series revolves around car customizer Ryan Friedlinghaus and his staff at West Coast Customs as they transform ordinary, factory-model vehicles into extraordinary, fully customized vehicles. The show has featured cameo appearances by celebrities that include Shaquille O'Neal, Mark Wahlberg, will.i.am, Justin Bieber and Conan O'Brien.

The first season of Inside West Coast Customs consisted of 11 episodes which originally aired in 2011. The second season's 16 episodes followed in 2012. The third season had a production run of five episodes which were originally broadcast from February 2013 to March 2013. Following season 3, the show briefly dropped the Inside from the name and changed networks to Fox Sports 2. For its seventh season, Inside West Coast Customs kept its original name and moved to Velocity (now Motor Trend). Inside West Coast Customs premiered its eighth season in 2018.

Series overview

Episodes

Season 1

Season 2

Season 3

Season 4

Season 5

Season 6

Season 7

Season 8

References

West Coast Customs TV Show

Automotive television series
2010s American reality television series
2011 American television series debuts
2018 American television series endings
Motor Trend (TV network) original programming